The 2017 Nielsen Pro Tennis Championship was a professional tennis tournament played on hard courts. It was the 26th edition of the tournament which was part of the 2017 ATP Challenger Tour. It took place in Winnetka, Illinois, between 11 and 16 July 2017.

Singles main-draw entrants

Seeds

 1 Rankings are as of July 3, 2017.

Other entrants
The following players received wildcards into the singles main draw:
  JC Aragone
  Christopher Eubanks
  Tom Fawcett
  Strong Kirchheimer

The following players received entry into the singles main draw using protected rankings:
  Kevin King
  Bradley Klahn

The following players received entry into the singles main draw as alternates:
  Alex Bolt
  Christopher Rungkat

The following players received entry from the qualifying draw:
  Aron Hiltzik
  Dennis Nevolo
  Martin Redlicki
  Logan Smith

Champions

Singles

  Akira Santillan def.  Ramkumar Ramanathan 7–6(7–1), 6–2.

Doubles

  Sanchai Ratiwatana /  Christopher Rungkat def.  Kevin King /  Bradley Klahn 7–6(7–4), 6–2.

External links
Official website

Nielsen Pro Tennis Championship
2017
Nielsen Pro Tennis Championship
Nielsen Pro Tennis Championship
Nielsen Pro Tennis Championship